Paraducetia is a genus of Asian bush crickets that belong to the subfamily Phaneropterinae and the tribe Ducetiini.  The two known species have been recorded from southern China and Indo-China.

Species
Species and subspecies include:
Paraducetia cruciata (Brunner von Wattenwyl, 1891) - Indo-China
Paraducetia cruciata cruciata (Brunner von Wattenwyl, 1891) - Cambodia
Paraducetia cruciata gialai Gorochov, 2010 - Vietnam
Paraducetia paracruciata Gorochov & Kang, 2002 - southern China - type species

References

Phaneropterinae
Tettigoniidae genera
Orthoptera of Indo-China